Psalm 145 is the 145th psalm of the Book of Psalms, generally known in English by its first verse, in the King James Version, "I will extol thee, my God, O king; and I will bless thy name for ever and ever". In Latin, it is known as "Exaltabo te Deus meus rex". It is the last psalm in the final Davidic collection of psalms, comprising Psalms 138 to 145, which are specifically attributed to David in their opening verses.

In the slightly different numbering system used in the Greek Septuagint version of the Bible, and in the Latin Vulgate, this psalm is Psalm 144. The psalm is a hymn psalm.

The psalm forms a regular part of Jewish, Catholic, Lutheran, Anglican and other Protestant liturgies. It has often been set to music, notably  by Antonín Dvořák who set several verses in Czech in his Biblical Songs.

Background and themes
This is the only psalm which identifies itself as a תְּהִלָה (tehillah) – as a psalm (namely, a hymn of praise). The version in the Dead Sea Scrolls instead describes itself as a "prayer" although it does not contain any request. 

Psalm 145 is an alphabetic acrostic, the initial letter of each verse being the Hebrew alphabet in sequence. For this purpose, the usual Hebrew numbering of verse 1, which begins with the title, "A Psalm of David", is ignored in favor of the non-Hebrew numbering which treats verse 1 as beginning ארוממך (Aromimkha, "I will exalt You").

The Dead Sea Scrolls version also ends each verse with the recurring (non-canonical) refrain, "Blessed be YHVH and blessed be His name forever and ever" and adds at the end of the Psalm the tag, "This is for a memorial". The Dead Sea Scrolls version also preserves a line beginning with the letter nun.

Psalm 145 is the last Psalm attributed explicitly to David, and also the last of the nine acrostic Psalms in its placement in the Book of Psalms (the acrostic Psalms being Psalms 9, 10, 25, 34, 37, 111, 112, 119 and 145). Methodist writer Joseph Benson notes that the king (David) praises "his king", "termed so by way of eminence: the King of kings, the God by whom kings reign".

Text

Hebrew Bible version
The following is the Hebrew text of Psalm 145:

King James Version
(David's Psalm of praise.)
 I will extol thee, my God, O king; and I will bless thy name for ever and ever.
 Every day will I bless thee; and I will praise thy name for ever and ever.
 Great is the LORD, and greatly to be praised; and his greatness is unsearchable.
 One generation shall praise thy works to another, and shall declare thy mighty acts.
 I will speak of the glorious honour of thy majesty, and of thy wondrous works.
 And men shall speak of the might of thy terrible acts: and I will declare thy greatness.
 They shall abundantly utter the memory of thy great goodness, and shall sing of thy righteousness.
 The LORD is gracious, and full of compassion; slow to anger, and of great mercy.
 The LORD is good to all: and his tender mercies are over all his works.
 All thy works shall praise thee, O LORD; and thy saints shall bless thee.
 They shall speak of the glory of thy kingdom, and talk of thy power;
 To make known to the sons of men his mighty acts, and the glorious majesty of his kingdom.
 Thy kingdom is an everlasting kingdom, and thy dominion endureth throughout all generations.
 The LORD upholdeth all that fall, and raiseth up all those that be bowed down.
 The eyes of all wait upon thee; and thou givest them their meat in due season.
 Thou openest thine hand, and satisfiest the desire of every living thing.
 The LORD is righteous in all his ways, and holy in all his works.
 The LORD is nigh unto all them that call upon him, to all that call upon him in truth.
 He will fulfil the desire of them that fear him: he also will hear their cry, and will save them.
 The LORD preserveth all them that love him: but all the wicked will he destroy.
 My mouth shall speak the praise of the LORD: and let all flesh bless his holy name for ever and ever.

The "missing verse"
Being an alphabetic acrostic psalm, the initial letter of each verse in Psalm 145 should be the Hebrew alphabet in sequence, but in the Masoretic Text there is no verse beginning with the letter nun, which would come between verses 13 and 14. A very common supposition is that there had been such a verse but it was omitted by a copyist's error. If so, that error must have occurred very early. Since verse 14, the samech verse, contains the word "נֹּפְלִ֑ים" (the fallen), the Talmud conjectures that King David foresaw the destruction ("fall") of Israel and omitted a verse starting with nun, while nevertheless hinting to it in the next verse (c.f. the pattern of verse 12, ending with "מַלְכוּתֽוֹ" (His kingship), and verse 13, starting with "מַֽלְכוּתְךָ֗" (Your kingship)). The explanation may not satisfy modern readers (it did not satisfy Rabbi David Kimhi of the 13th century), but it demonstrates that the absence of a verse beginning with that letter was noticed and was undisputed even in antiquity. 

However, the Septuagint, the Latin Vulgate (which is largely based on the Septuagint), the Syriac Peshitta, and the Dead Sea Scrolls (11QPs-ɑ; which shows some affinity with the Septuagint, e.g., the inclusion of a 151st Psalm) all provide a verse at this point which commences (in Hebrew) with nun—נֶאֱמָן 
 "Faithful is God in His sayings, and Honest in all His works" 
 . 

New Revised Standard Version
 Your kingdom is an everlasting kingdom,
 and your dominion endures throughout all generations. 
 The Lord is faithful in all his words,
 and gracious in all his deeds.

This verse is now inserted at the end of verse 13 (sometimes numbered "verse 13b") in several Christian versions of the Bible including the New Revised Standard, the New American, the Today's English Version, the Moffat, and others. However, not everyone is convinced that this nun verse is authentic.  It is, except for the first word, identical to verse 17 (צ) ("Righteous is YHVH in all His ways…"), and thus, as Kimmelman argues, may have been a post-facto attempt to "cure" the apparent deficiency.  These ancient versions all have other departures from the traditional Hebrew text which make them imperfect evidence of the original text; for example, the Dead Sea Scrolls version ends every verse in Psalm 145 with "Blessed be YHVH and blessed is His name forever and ever". And no such nun verse is found in other important ancient translations from the Hebrew — the Aramaic Targum, the Greek versions of Aquila, Symmachus, and Theodotion — nor is such a verse quoted anywhere in the Talmud. Additionally, there are other alphabetic acrostics in the Book of Psalms — specifically Psalms 25 and 34 — that also imperfectly follow the alphabet. It is plausible that a nun verse was not part of the original text.

Uses

Judaism
 The majority of the prayer Ashrei that is recited thrice daily is Psalm 145 (see the entry for Ashrei for further details on its use in Jewish liturgy).
 Verse 13 is found in the repetition to the Amidah on Rosh Hashanah.
 Verse 16 is found in the final paragraph of Birkat Hamazon. It is also recited while donning the tefillin a after the head tefillin is securely in place.
 Verse 21 is recited by some following Psalm 126 (Shir Hama'alot) preceding Birkat Hamazon.

Musical settings
Czech composer Antonín Dvořák set verses 1–3, 5 and 6 (together with Psalm 144 verse 9) to music in No. 5 of his Biblical Songs (1894).  Brian Shamash has recorded one of the most common traditional Jewish melodies for chanting Ashrei.

Giovanni Bernardone, better known as Francis of Assisi, wrote a poem towards the end of his life, in 1225, based on Psalm 145 which Draper adapted to the song "All Creatures of Our God and King" in 1919.

Notes

References

External links 

  in Hebrew and English - Mechon-mamre
 
 
 Text of Psalm 145 according to the 1928 Psalter
 I will extol you, my God and king. text and footnotes, usccb.org United States Conference of Catholic Bishops
 Psalm 145 – Praising God for Who He Is and What He Does text and detailed commentary, enduringword.com
 Psalm 145:1 introduction and text, biblestudytools.com
 Psalm 145 / Refrain: Great is the Lord and highly to be praised. Church of England
 Psalm 145 at biblegateway.com
Hymnary.org, Hymns for Psalm 145 

145
Works attributed to David